María Consuelo Casal Mínguez (born 26 February 1958) is a Spanish actress. The daughter of actor Antonio Casal, she is perhaps the best known as secretary in Un, dos, tres... responda otra vez and for her roles in television series Hospital Central and Física o Química.

Personal life 
Casal was born María Consuelo Casal Mínguez on 26 February 1958 in Madrid. She is of Galician origin through her father, actor Antonio Casal. Her mother, Madrilenian Carmen Mínguez was also an actress. Her father died when she was 16. Casal is fluent in Spanish, English, French and Italian language.

Filmography

References

External links 
 

1958 births
Living people
Actresses from Madrid
Spanish film actresses
Spanish stage actresses
Spanish television actresses
20th-century Spanish actresses
21st-century Spanish actresses